Gutierrezia is a genus of flowering plants in the family Asteraceae, native to western North America and western South America. Plants of this genus are known generally as snakeweeds or matchweeds. Some species have been called greasewood. They are annual or perennial plants or subshrubs with yellow or white flowers.

These plants contain chemical compounds which can be toxic to livestock and some are considered weeds.

 Species
 Gutierrezia alamanii - Chihuahua
 Gutierrezia argyrocarpa - Hidalgo
 Gutierrezia arizonica – Arizona snakeweed - Arizona, Sonora
 Gutierrezia baccharoides - Chile, Argentina
 Gutierrezia californica – San Joaquin snakeweed - California, Baja California, Arizona (Yavapai Co)
 Gutierrezia conoidea - Chihuahua, Durango, Jalisco, Zacatecas
 Gutierrezia dracunculoides - USA (from Arizona to Nebraska + Tennessee)
 Gutierrezia dunalii - Morelos, México State
 Gutierrezia elegans - Lone Mesa snakeweed
 Gutierrezia espinosae - Chile
 Gutierrezia gayana - Chile
 Gutierrezia gilliesii - Argentina
 Gutierrezia grandis - Nuevo León, Coahuila
 Gutierrezia isernii - Argentina
 Gutierrezia mandonii - Argentina, Bolivia
 Gutierrezia microcephala – threadleaf snakeweed - southwestern USA, northern Mexico 
 Gutierrezia neaeana - Chile
 Gutierrezia paniculata - Chile
 Gutierrezia petradoria – San Pedro snakeweed - Utah
 Gutierrezia pomariensis - Utah
 Gutierrezia pulviniformis - Argentina
 Gutierrezia ramulosa  - Baja California
 Gutierrezia repens - Argentina
 Gutierrezia resinosa - Chile
 Gutierrezia sarothrae – broom snakeweed - western Canada, western + central USA, northern Mexico
 Gutierrezia sericocarpa - San Luis Potosí, Durango, Zacatecas, Guanajuato, Querétaro, Nayarit
 Gutierrezia serotina – late snakeweed - Arizona
 Gutierrezia solbrigii - Argentina
 Gutierrezia spathulata - Argentina
 Gutierrezia sphaerocephala – roundleaf snakeweed - USA (Arizona, New Mexico, Texas), northern Mexico
 Gutierrezia taltalensis - Chile
 Gutierrezia texana – Texas snakeweed - USA (New Mexico, Texas Oklahoma Louisiana Arkansas), Nuevo León
 Gutierrezia wrightii – Wright's snakeweed - USA (Arizona, New Mexico), Chihuahua, Durango, Sonora

References

External links

 Jepson Manual Treatment

 
Asteraceae genera
Flora of North America
Flora of Central America
Flora of western South America
Taxa named by Mariano Lagasca
Plant dyes